Lampang Airport  serves Lampang, the capital city of Lampang Province, Thailand.

The New Terminal at Lampang Airport opened on 27 September 2015 and opened to the public on 22 October 2015.

(2016 budget year)

Airlines and destinations

Runway taxiway and parking lot
 Taxiway is same as the runway.

Buildings
 Air Traffic Control Building
 Tactical Air Navigation Building (NDB, VOR / DME, ILS)
 Air Field Lighting Building
 Airport Electricity System Building (PAPI, APP LIGHT. R/W T/W LIGHT)
 Emergency Electric Generator Building
 Fire Brigade and Salvation army Building
 Chancery 2 Floors 1 Building
 Arrival lounge
 Departure lounge
 Check-in Counter 3 Counters
 VIP Rooms 2 Rooms
 Shop
 Payphone
 Car Parking Lots
 Staff Building

Statistics

References

External links

 Lampang Airport, Dept of Civil Aviation

Airports in Thailand
Buildings and structures in Lampang province
Airports established in 1923